The Relics of Sainte-Chapelle are relics of Jesus Christ acquired by the French monarchy in the Middle Ages and now conserved by the Archdiocese of Paris. They were originally housed at Sainte-Chapelle in Paris, France and are now in the cathedral treasury of Notre-Dame de Paris.

History

Medieval and early modern
Saint Louis (King Louis IX) built Sainte-Chapelle in the 13th century to house the Holy Crown, a fragment of the True Cross and other relics he had acquired from Baldwin II of Constantinople. This made the chapel itself an immense reliquary, housing the crown, the True Cross fragment, relics of the Virgin Mary, the Holy Lance, the Holy Sponge and the Mandylion, a supposed image of Christ.

In the early modern era, the kings of France drained their treasury, sold rubies and melted down gold to supply their vast military spending needs, making all the chapel's ecclesiastical treasures into a monetary reserve that could be used if needed, as they had also been in the medieval era. This meant that under Henry IV of France (reigned 1589–1610) what was left of the treasure was reduced to the state it would retain until the French Revolution.

Revolution to present
The Revolution meant a ban on conserving relics and all other sacred symbols linked to the kings, though this allowed for pieces judged to be of high artistic quality to be saved. These relics were handed over to the archbishop of Paris in 1804 and are still held in the cathedral treasury of Notre Dame, cared for by the Knights of the Holy Sepulchre and the cathedral chapter. The first Friday of every month at 3 PM, guarded by the Knights, the Holy Relics are exposed for veneration and adoration by the faithful before the cathedral's high altar. Every Good Friday, this adoration lasts all day, punctuated by the liturgical offices. An exhibition entitled Le trésor de la Sainte-Chapelle was installed at the Louvre in 2001. After the April 2019 fire at Notre-Dame, the relics were moved for safekeeping first to the Paris city hall overnight, and then to the Louvre.

Notes and references

Bibliography 

Durand, Jannic. Le trésor de la Sainte Chapelle. Exh. cat. Paris, 31 mai–27 août 2001. Réunion des musées nationaux, Paris, 2001.
Hahn, Cynthia. The Reliquary Effect: Enshrining the Sacred Object. London: Reaktion Books, 2017: 122–130.
Hahn, Cynthia. "The Sting of Death is the Thorn, But the Circle of the Crown is Victory Over Death: The Making of the Crown of Thorns." In Saints and Sacred Matter, edited by Cynthia Hahn and Holger Klein. Washington: Dumbarton Oaks, 2014: 107–109.

Relics associated with Jesus
Notre-Dame de Paris
Order of the Holy Sepulchre